Pierre-Gustave Roze (28 November 1812 – November 1883) was a French admiral. He was born in Toulon, France, and throughout his adult life served as a career naval officer. As a young rear admiral (contre-amiral) he served in Mexico during the French intervention there of 1862. In 1865 he was appointed commander of the French Far Eastern Station (Station des mers de Chine). As commander, he was primarily stationed in Yokohama, headquarters of the French Far Eastern Squadron, though he was involved in naval operations in nearby Korea and French Indochina in 1866. He won most recognition during the French Campaign against Korea in 1866, an offensive involving the French Far Eastern Squadron as well as French marines that proved a failed attempt to force reparations from the Korean court for its persecution of French and native Catholics.

After the Korean expedition Roze and his fleet returned to Japan, where they were able to welcome the first French military mission to Japan (1867–1868) in Yokohama harbor on January 13, 1867. Roze was recalled to France in 1868. He was named vice admiral in 1869 and served on the Admiralty Council (Conseil d'amirauté). He was named Préfet Maritime de la Manche et de la Mer du Nord, a position he held between 1869 and 1871 and during which he served to guard the Brittany coast during the Franco-Prussian War. In 1875, Roze was named commander of the Mediterranean Squadron (Escadre de la Méditerranée).

Roze died in Paris in 1883.

External links
French campaign against Korea, 1866

External links
  Pierre-Gustave Roze
  L'expédition en Corée du contre-amiral Roze
  L'expédition de l'Amiral Roze
  La France manque une opportunité

1812 births
1883 deaths
Rose
Military history of Korea